Philodryas chamissonis, commonly known as the Chilean green racer and the long-tailed snake, is a species of moderately venomous opisthoglyphous (rear-fanged) snake in the family Colubridae. The species is endemic to Chile.

Etymology
The specific name, chamissonis, is in honor of German botanist and poet Adelbert von Chamisso.

Geographic range
P. chamissonis has a large distribution in Chile, from Paposo to Valdivia.

Description
Usually, P. chamissonis is gray, with black and white longitudinal stripes on the body. It is a medium-sized snake, which usually reaches  in total length (including tail).

The length of the tail is 25-28.5 % of the total length. There are 8 upper labials, the 4th and 5th entering the eye. The smooth dorsal scales are arranged in 19 rows at midbody. Ventrals 179-225; anal plate divided; subcaudals 100-122.

Habitat

Diet

The diet of P. chamissonis is mainly composed of little rodents, birds, amphibians, and other smaller reptiles. For example, it especially preys upon lizards of the genus Liolaemus.

Reproduction
P. chamissonis is an oviparous reptile.

Venom
Because P. chamissonis is rarely found, bites by it are uncommon. However, its bite is painful and causes extensive swelling.

References

Further reading
Freiberg M (1982). Snakes of South America. Hong Kong: T.F.H. Publications. 189 pp. . (Dromicus chamissonis, p. 95).
Wiegmann AFA (1835). "Beiträge zur Zoologie, Gesammelt auf einer Reise um die Erde. Siebente Abhandlung. Amphibien ". Nova Acta Physico-Medica Academiae Caesareae Leopoldino-Carolinae Naturae Curiosorum (Wrocław and Bonn) 17: 185-268 + Plates XIII-XXII. (Coronella chamissonis, new species, pp. 246–250 + Plate XIX). (in German and Latin).

Colubrids
Snakes of South America
Reptiles of Chile
Endemic fauna of Chile
Reptiles described in 1834